Donald Clifford Johnson (September 14, 1920 – September 3, 1965) was an American football center and linebacker who played one season with the Cleveland Rams. 

Johnson was born in Chicago, Illinois on September 14, 1920, to John and Hanna Johnson. He played college football at the Northwestern University, having previously attended Austin Community Academy High School in Chicago. Johnson was married to Lois and had one son, Donald. He died in Oak Park, Illinois on September 3, 1965, at the age of 44.

References

1920 births
1965 deaths
American football centers
Cleveland Rams players
Northwestern Wildcats football players
Players of American football from Chicago